Windmill Quaker State is a historic service station located at Parkersburg, Wood County, West Virginia.  It was built in 1928 by the Quaker State Corporation, and is an example of an architectural folly.  It is a roughcast stucco building with a windmill atop the gable roof.

It was listed on the National Register of Historic Places in 1982.

See also 
 Cambern Dutch Shop Windmill: on the NRHP in Washington (state)

References

Buildings and structures in Parkersburg, West Virginia
Transportation buildings and structures on the National Register of Historic Places in West Virginia
Folly buildings on the National Register of Historic Places
Commercial buildings completed in 1928
National Register of Historic Places in Wood County, West Virginia
Gas stations on the National Register of Historic Places in West Virginia
1928 establishments in West Virginia
Shell plc buildings and structures
Windmills on the National Register of Historic Places